This is a list of cities in Iran, categorized by province. The census years listed below comes from the Statistical Center of Iran; since the year 2006 the country of Iran has had a census every 5 years. The cities that are bold are capitals of provinces, counties & districts. Iran has 31 provinces and 1245 cities.

Alborz Province

Ardabil Province

Bushehr Province

Chaharmahal and Bakhtiari Province

East Azerbaijan Province

Isfahan Province

Fars Province

Gilan Province

Golestan Province

Hamadan Province

Hormozgan Province

Ilam Province

Kerman Province

Kermanshah Province

Khuzestan Province

Kohgiluyeh and Boyer-Ahmad Province

Kurdistan Province

Lorestan Province

Markazi Province

Mazandaran Province

North Khorasan Province

Qazvin Province

Qom Province

Razavi Khorasan Province

Semnan Province

Sistan and Baluchestan Province

South Khorasan Province

Tehran Province

West Azerbaijan Province

Yazd Province

Zanjan Province

Ancient cities ruins
Chogha Zanbil
Ecbatana
Istakhr
Naqsh-e Rustam
Pasargadae
Persepolis
Shahr-e Sukhteh
Susa
Takht-e Soleymān
Tepe Sialk

See also
Counties of Iran
International rankings of Iran
List of castles in Iran
List of caves in Iran
List of cities in Asia
List of current Iran governors-general
List of earthquakes in Iran
List of Iranian four-thousanders
List of largest cities of Iran
List of lighthouses in Iran
List of planned cities
Provinces of Iran

References & notes

External links
Iran province

Further reading
 

 
 
Cities and towns by province
Iran
Iran